The 1914 Kilkenny Senior Hurling Championship was the 25th staging of the Kilkenny Senior Hurling Championship since its establishment by the Kilkenny County Board.

On 28 March 1914, Johnstown won the championship after a 3-01 to 0-00 defeat of Erin's Own in the final. This was their first championship title.

Results

Final

References

Kilkenny Senior Hurling Championship
Kilkenny Senior Hurling Championship